Habrodera nilotica is a beetle of the Cicindelidae.

Description
Elytra are orange-yellow win greenish markings. Pronotum has greenish reflections.

Distribution
This widespread species occurs in Canary Islands, North Africa and in the Afrotropical realm. It is usually found on sandy banks of rivers and lakes.

References
 Universal Biological Indexer
 Zipcodezoo
 Fauna europaea

External links
 Africa Coleoptera

Cicindelidae
Beetles described in 1825